Defending champion Dylan Alcott defeated Andy Lapthorne in the final, 6–2, 6–2 to win the quad singles wheelchair tennis title at the 2020 French Open.

Seeds

Draw

Finals

References

External Links
 Draw

Wheelchair Quad Singles
French Open, 2020 Quad Singles